The Lasso of Truth is a weapon wielded by DC Comics superhero Wonder Woman, Princess Diana of Themyscira. It is also known as the Lariat of Truth, the Magic Lasso, the Lasso of Hestia or the Golden Perfect.It was created by William Moulton Marston, inventor of the lie detector, as an allegory for feminine charm, but it later became more popular as a device to extract truth from people.

The lariat forces anyone it captures into submission; compelling its captives to obey the wielder of the lasso and tell the truth.

Origin and influences
William Moulton Marston created Wonder Woman but he also worked, in the period before, during and after World War I, on understanding and perfecting the systolic blood-pressure test while working on his Ph.D. in psychology at Harvard University. Blood pressure was one of several elements measured in the polygraph tests that were being perfected since as far back as Italian criminologist Cesare Lombroso, in 1895. Marston's wife, psychologist and lawyer Elizabeth Holloway Marston, one of his inspirations for the Wonder Woman character, also played a key role in his lie detector research.

But the lie detector had nothing to do with Marston's creation of the Magic Lasso. Wonder Woman's Magic Lasso or Golden Lasso was the direct result of their research into emotions and was more about submission than truth. So Marston created the Magic Lasso as an allegory for feminine charm and the compliant effect it has on people. The idea behind feminine allure was that submission to a pleasant controller (instead of a harsh one) was more pleasant and therefore made it more likely that people would submit.

In a 1997 academic article, psychologist Geoffry Bunn incorrectly reinforces a correlation between the lasso and the systolic blood-pressure test, stating:

Publication history

Pre-Crisis

The lasso was formed from Aphrodite's girdle, which made it indestructible and its magical properties were granted by the Goddess herself. The powers forced whoever was bound within it to obey the commands of whoever held the other end. This effect could be used on larger groups of people, although this reduced its efficiency. In addition to being unbreakable, the lasso was also infinitely elastic.

Diana coated it in special Amazon chemicals that allowed it to transform her civilian clothes into Wonder Woman's garb. Diana demonstrated a remarkable level of skill with the lasso, performing such feats as twirling it to create air currents (upon which she could float) and spinning it to emit certain frequencies that disrupted spells.

Post-Crisis
In the post-Crisis George Pérez rebooted the lasso by establishing that it was forged by the god Hephaestus from the Golden Girdle of Gaea once worn by Antiope, sister of Hippolyta. It is so strong that not even Hercules can break it. It is given to Diana after Hippolyta consults the Goddesses. Originally the lasso was given to Wonder Woman when she returned to Paradise Island. William Moulton Marston later retconned the origin story in Wonder Woman #1 (June 1942), in which it is shown that her mother gave it to her after Diana won a tournament on Paradise Island, before she left the island for the United States.

Empowered by the fires of Hestia, the lasso forces anyone held by it to tell the absolute truth.  Furthermore, simple physical contact with the lasso can be enough to have this effect such as when Barbara Ann Minerva attempted to swindle it from Diana, but was forced to confess her intentions when she held the lasso. It is also infinitely long, and can lengthen depending on its user's desire. The fires are said to even be able to cure insanity, as they did in the case of Ares, God of War, when he attempted to incite World War III. He renounced his plan when the lasso showed him that such a war would not only destroy all life on Earth as he wished, but also any potential worshippers he sought to gain from it. The lasso possesses incredible strength and is virtually unbreakable. One story even showed Wonder Woman using the lasso to contain the explosion of two atom bombs. Unable to stop the American bombs that would set off a Russian doomsday machine she wrapped the bombs in her lasso and let the bombs explode. It has easily held beings with tremendous superhuman strength such as Superman, Captain Marvel, who has the strength of Hercules and the Power of Zeus, and Power Girl, as well as gods such as Ares and Heracles. (In several Pre-Crisis stories, it was even capable of binding Wonder Woman herself on the occasions she was caught, sometimes by Gunther.) It is shown that Wonder Woman still has her powers even if bound by the lasso.

The only times it has ever been shown to break was when truth itself was challenged. For example, in JLA the lasso broke when she refused to believe the confession it wrought from Rama Khan of Jarhanpur.Elsewhere, when the backwards-thinking monster Bizarro was caught in Trinity, he was horrified by the very idea of truth. As the antithesis of reason and logic he was able to break the lasso. The fairy tale villainess, Queen of Fables, who has the power to bring any fictional or non-true character to life, and is herself "fictional", had power over the lasso by bringing fictional characters to life and having her non-true minions break it. It is worth noting that Wonder Woman had in fact hoped to win simply by lassoing her and let its powers of truth destroy the fairy tale villain.

The magic lasso has subsequently been shown to produce a wide array of effects. When battling the entity Decay, Wonder Woman used the lasso's link to Gaia, the Greek Goddess of the Earth, as a circuit between the earth and the monster, pumping the entity of death with life-giving energies that destroyed the creature. Diana herself stated that the lasso's connection to Gaea also constantly renews its user with these energies. Wonder Woman has also used it to create a ring of protective fire around people to protect them from Circe's bestiamorphs. The lasso's energies are also shown to be capable of destroying beings forcibly resurrected by the rings of the Black Lantern Corps. As the goddess of truth, Diana also used it to take memories of Donna Troy and restore her to life. In Pre-Crisis comics, the lasso also had the power to effectively control those who were bound within it.

In the mini-comic enclosed with the release of the Kenner Super Powers figure of Wonder Woman, the Amazing Amazon ensnares a mind-controlled Superman with her lasso, preventing him from destroying the Washington Monument. Superman is unable to resist the powers of the lasso as Wonder Woman renders him unconscious. Later, Wonder Woman uses her lasso on Brainiac and commands the villain to release Superman from his mind control.

In later Post-Crisis comics, the power of truth was written as innate to Wonder Woman herself, with the lasso merely a focus of that power. A storyline in the Morrison-era JLA comics by Joe Kelly depicted the lasso as an archetypal manifestation of universal truth, and, once broken (like when Wonder Woman doubted the truth that it was revealing to her because she didn't like it), disrupted the underlying truth of reality itself. With the lasso broken, reality came to be dictated by whatever people believed to be the case, starting with older beliefs and extending to beliefs that were held by various individuals in the present. This resulted in Earth becoming the center of the universe for two weeks, Earth becoming flat for several hours, the moon turning into cheese for a time, Kyle Rayner assuming a Hal Jordan-like appearance (many people still saw Hal as 'the' Green Lantern), and Batman fading in and out of existence due to his 'urban legend' status (meaning that people weren't sure if he even existed). This allegorical interpretation is often ignored in later stories and by much of fandom, as the lasso was long established as magically unable to break, and was never before stated to be the ultimate representation of truth. During her adventures with the Justice League team of superheroes Diana eventually battled a villain named Amazo who was able to duplicate aspects of the lasso for his own use.

During her current tenure as writer for Wonder Woman, Gail Simone has further explored the nature of the Lasso of Truth, describing it as "a deadly weapon, that not only binds you, and follows its mistress’ commands, the damned thing can see into your soul."

This lasso should not be confused with the lasso of the current Wonder Girl, Cassie Sandsmark. That lasso, given to her by Ares, has the power to shock a target with "Zeus' lightning if Cassandra ropes her target and becomes angry with them. Donna Troy also wields a mystical lasso of her own called the Lasso of Persuasion, which has the ability to persuade anyone within its confines to do Donna's bidding if her willpower is greater than theirs.

Similarly, the character Bizarra also has a magic lasso, the difference being that her lasso forces one to tell lies.

Despite Wonder Woman's lasso being mystical in origin, in Bruce Wayne: The Road Home, shows that Batman apparently has reverse-engineered the Amazo technology, which aids duplicating the lasso's capabilities artificially. During Endgame, when the Joker uses a toxin to turn the Justice League against Batman, Batman is able to immobilise Diana using the 'blind of veils', essentially a Lasso of Lies that was woven by Hephaestus after he created the original Lasso by inverting the original weave. Allegedly created using the wool from the sheep used by Odysseus and his men to escape the blind cyclops, it took Batman two years to acquire on the supernatural black market, incorporating it into a suit of armor specifically designed to stand up to the Justice League, with the blind of veils trapping Diana in an illusion where she has killed Batman.

In the Elseworlds tale Red Son, Wonder Woman was subdued and restrained in her own lasso by the Soviet terrorist incarnation of Batman. In order to free herself and rescue Superman from Lex Luthor's deadly red sun lamps, Wonder Woman snapped the cords of her "indestructible" lasso. The shock of the incident appeared to age Diana, leaving her grey-haired, frail, and unable to speak.

In other media

In film

DC Extended Universe

The lasso appears in the film Batman v Superman: Dawn of Justice, where Wonder Woman makes her first live action theatrical film appearance. It is used in the battle against Doomsday to tie the monster down until Superman stabs him with the kryptonite spear.

It subsequently appears in the 2017 Wonder Woman film, in which it is also called Lasso of Hestia. In the film, it is used for its truth-inducing abilities, but tactically, Diana uses it as a whip, and as a grappling tool, and as a shield from projectiles near the end of her battle with Ares.

In Justice League, the Lasso primarily appears in the use for truth, beginning with an interrogation of a terrorist as well as when Aquaman comes into conact with it, causing him to confess his doubts about the team's impending mission against Steppenwolf, as well as his attraction to Diana herself (a scene omitted from the director's cut). She subsequently uses on the resurrected Superman to remind him who he is. .

The lasso is used the aforementioned ways when it appears in the sequel Wonder Woman 1984, as well as in Wonder Woman's experiments in self-powered flight.

Teen Titans Go! To the Movies
In the 2018 animated film Teen Titans Go! To the Movies, the Teen Titans travel back to when Wonder Woman was a child on Themyscira, where they find her practising with the Lasso of Truth. In order to prevent her from becoming a superhero, they snatch it from her and use it as a skipping rope instead, although they later travel back and return it to her after realising how much the world needs superheroes.

In television

Wonder Woman (TV series)

The lasso features in the 1970s live-action Wonder Woman series. In season one the lasso had the power to compel those bound to tell the truth. Beginning with the second season, it also had the power to cause selective amnesia. The lasso appeared to be able to expand and contract, as in the comic books; instead of being a cord of several links at her waist, it is indefinitely longer and sturdier when used to lasso people or being thrown. In season two, with the updated costume, the lasso is even shorter and more like fabric, and only about twenty feet long, unless used to lasso a person or object. It was significantly longer and heavier when in use.

Super Friends/Super Powers Team
In the Super Friends animated series, the lasso possessed the ability to follow the telepathic commands of Wonder Woman, physically moving on its own to accomplish tasks. The ability is never displayed in the comics, although it is hinted that without her tiara, Wonder Woman cannot fully utilize the lasso's ability. In Super Friends, Wonder Woman was typically displayed using the lasso as a tool for accomplishing feats of strength, leaving it unclear to what extent Wonder Woman herself possessed great strength or the lasso itself performed the feats. In addition, its truth-compelling power was used in the Challenge of the Super Friends episode "Sinbad and the Space Pirates". Superman found himself snared by the lasso, but he manages to tie the controlled Wonder Woman as well. In that situation, Superman forces her to confess whether he is her enemy or friend and the truth of her friendship with him forced from Wonder Woman broke the pirates' power over her. This power was also used in The World's Greatest Super Friends episode "Space Knights of Camelon".

On The Super Powers Team: Galactic Guardians, in the episode "The Fear", Wonder Woman suggests using the lasso to get a confession out of one of Scarecrow's victims, though Professor Jonathan Crane (out of costume) warns her against it for fear of trauma.

DC Animated Universe

In the Justice League animated series, the lasso is only used as an exceptionally long, flexible, and unbreakable rope. In Justice League Unlimited however, Wonder Woman's lasso was officially portrayed as being able to compel the truth. This ability was finally unleashed in the episode "The Balance" by Wonder Woman's mother Queen Hippolyta who revealed that Diana had stolen the uniform before being told of its full capabilities. Upon touching the star on the tiara, various parts of the Wonder Woman costume began to temporarily glow such as the tiara, bracelets, belt and lasso. It was after this that Diana discovered that the lasso could compel truth. However, in the series, Diana only used the truth powers of the lasso once, on the demon Abnegazar to learn the location of Felix Faust, an event that occurred in the same episode.

In video games 

The Lasso features as part of Wonder Woman's arsenal in Justice League Heroes, most notably when Wonder Woman interrogates Darkseid to learn how they can defeat him after the main plot of the game is revealed to have been Darkseid manipulating Brainiac to ensure his own resurrection.

The Lasso was used in the Injustice: Gods Among Us video game.

Footnotes

References
 Brown, Matthew J. / "Love Slaves and Wonder Women: "/ "Radical Feminism and Social Reform in the Psychology of William Moulton Marston", (Uncopyrighted scholarly report) (2016): pp 1–39.
 Bunn, Geoffrey C. "The Lie Detector, Wonder Woman and Liberty:The Life and Works of William Moulton Marston,",  History of the Human Sciences, 10 (1997):  pp 91–119.
 Jett, Brett.  "Who Is Wonder Woman?","  (Manuscript) (2009): pp 1–101.
 Jett, Brett.  "Who Is WW?: Magic Lasso", "  (Article) (2015).
 Lamb, Marguerite. "Who Was Wonder Woman? Long-ago LAW alumna Elizabeth Marston was the muse who gave us a superheroine". Boston University Alumni Magazine, Fall 2001.
 Lepore, Jill. The Secret History of Wonder Woman, New York: Alfred A. Knopf, 2014, 
 Moore, Mark Harrison. The Polygraph and Lie Detection. Committee to Review the Scientific Evidence on the Polygraph (National Research Council (U.S.)), 2003.
 Richard, Olive. "Our Women Are Our Future" (Article), Family Circle, 14 August 1942.
 Valcour, Francinne.  Manipulating the Messenger: Wonder Woman as an American Female Icon (Dissertation)(2006): 1–372.

Fictional elements introduced in 1942
Wonder Woman
1942 in comics
Ropes
Fantasy weapons
DC Comics weapons
Magic items
Lie detection